Riethgen is a village and a former municipality in the Sömmerda district of Thuringia, Germany. On 1 January 2023 it became part of the municipality Kindelbrück.

References

Sömmerda (district)
Former municipalities in Thuringia